Mauricio Antonio Cruz Jiron (born 11 March 1957) is a former Nicaraguan footballer who currently coaches CD Walter Ferretti in the Primera División de Nicaragua.

Club career
During his career he  played for Diriangén and Honduran outfit Universidad.

International career
Cruz made his debut for Nicaragua in the 1970s and represented his country in 2 FIFA World Cup qualification matches, both in 1992 versus El Salvador. Cruz represented Nicaragua at the 1975 Pan American Games.

His final international was a July 1992 FIFA World Cup qualification match against El Salvador.

Managerial career
He has been national team manager during 1998 and 2002 FIFA World Cup qualification matches and again during a short 2010 FIFA World Cup qualification spell in 2008. Cruz took charge of Diriangén again in summer 2008 after he had left them in 2006.

Personal life
He has a brother named Donaldo Jiron.

References

External links
 La tripleta galáctica: los mejores mediocampistas del futbol
 MISL stats

1957 births
Living people
Nicaraguan men's footballers
Nicaragua international footballers
Diriangén FC players
Nicaraguan expatriate footballers
Expatriate footballers in Honduras
Nicaraguan expatriate sportspeople in Honduras
Expatriate soccer players in the United States
Nicaraguan expatriate sportspeople in the United States
Chicago Horizons players
Major Indoor Soccer League (1978–1992) players
Diriangén F.C. managers
Liga Nacional de Fútbol Profesional de Honduras players
Nicaraguan football managers
Nicaragua national football team managers
Association football forwards